Piers Calveley Claughton (8 June 1814 – 11 August 1884)  was an Anglican colonial bishop and author.

Early life 
The son of Thomas Claughton (M.P. for Newton, Lancashire, 1818 – 25) of Haydock Lodge, he was educated at Brasenose College, Oxford,  where he graduated, B.A. (1835) and M.A. (1838). He was elected a Fellow of University College, Oxford in 1836.

Ordination and advancement 
Following his ordination in 1838 he was made rector of Elton, Huntingdonshire (1842 – 43; 1845 – 59), before becoming the first Bishop of St Helena (1859 – 61) and a subsequent translation to the see of Colombo (1862 – 71). Upon his return to England he served as Archdeacon of London and a canon of St Paul's from 1870 to 1884 and was appointed Chaplain-General of Her Majesty's Forces in 1875.

Death 
He died in Maida Vale, London. A memorial tablet was placed in the crypt of St. Paul's Cathedral, London in 1885. A stamp was issued to commemorate the 150th anniversary of the Diocese of St Helena which bore his image. his brother was Bishop of Rochester from 1867 to 1877; and then of St Albans until 1890.

Publications 
Amongst others he wrote: 

 Knowledge the Reward of Obedience, 1840
 A Brief Comparison of the Thirty-nine Articles of the Church of England with Holy Scripture, 1843
 
 The Gospel Invitation, 1859
 The Jews in relation to the Church and the World, 1877
 The Manner of the Growth of Christ's Kingdom, 1877

See also

Notes and references 

 
 Colonies And India Newspaper Archive: October 24, 1884 - Page 12

External links 
 Hathi Trust
 Project Canterbury
 The Church of Ceylon (Anglican Communion)
 National Archives
 150th Anniversary of the Diocese of St Helena - Piers Calveley Claughton

1814 births
1884 deaths
Anglican bishops of St Helena
Archdeacons of London
Anglican bishops of Colombo
British expatriates in Sri Lanka
People educated at The King's School, Chester
Chaplains General to the Forces
Alumni of Brasenose College, Oxford
Fellows of University College, Oxford
People from Elton, Cambridgeshire